Catherine Banner (born 1989) is a British author, born in Cambridge, England and living in Turin, Italy. She gained international attention with her first book, The Eyes of a King, which she began writing when she was fourteen and still a school student. She studied at Coleridge Community College and went onto be educated at Hills Road Sixth Form College.

Banner studied English at Fitzwilliam College, Cambridge, before moving to County Durham where she worked as a secondary school teacher. She has published a trilogy of young adult novels, The Last Descendants. Her debut adult novel, The House at the Edge of Night, was published in 2016. Her work is translated into 22 languages. She lives in Turin, Italy, with her husband.

Bibliography

The Last Descendants
 2008 - Eyes of a King
 2009 - Voices in the Dark
 2015 - The Heart at War

Other novels
 The House at the Edge of Night (2016)

References

External links
 Official website 
 Catherine Banner @ House Of Legends
 The Eyes of a King (The Last Descendants, Book 1) at RandomHouse.ca

 Catherine Banner on Fantasy Fan

1989 births
Alumni of Fitzwilliam College, Cambridge
Living people
British fantasy writers
English fantasy writers
English women novelists
Women science fiction and fantasy writers